Lyon Township is a civil township of Roscommon County in the U.S. state of Michigan. The population was 1,370 at the 2010 census.

Communities
The Higgins Lake 48627 ZIP Code serves a small portion of the township.
Lyon Town Hall is a former settlement founded in 1902 by hotel owner Charles Lyon.  The township would later be named after him when it was established in 1921 from the western section of Gerrish Township.  

Geography
Lyon Township has a coastline along Higgins Lake.

Demographics
As of the census of 2000, there were 1,462 people, 688 households, and 467 families residing in the township. The racial makeup of the township was 98.56% White, 0.14% African American, 0.21% Native American, 0.14% Asian, 0.07% from other races, and 0.89% from two or more races. Hispanic or Latino of any race were 1.71% of the population.

There were 688 households, out of which 17.4% had children under the age of 18 living with them, 59.4% were married couples living together, 5.4% had a female householder with no husband present, and 32.1% were non-families. 28.9% of all households were made up of individuals, and 14.0% had someone living alone who was 65 years of age or older.  The average household size was 2.13 and the average family size was 2.55.

In the township the population was spread out, with 16.3% under the age of 18, 3.6% from 18 to 24, 19.4% from 25 to 44, 31.7% from 45 to 64, and 29.0% who were 65 years of age or older.  The median age was 52 years. For every 100 females, there were 106.2 males.  For every 100 females age 18 and over, there were 103.5 males.

The median income for a household in the township was $33,226, and the median income for a family was $37,875. Males had a median income of $32,237 versus $21,583 for females. The per capita income for the township was $19,232.  About 6.4% of families and 10.8% of the population were below the poverty line, including 22.3% of those under age 18 and 1.7% of those age 65 or over.

References

External links
 Official website

Townships in Roscommon County, Michigan
Townships in Michigan
1921 establishments in Michigan
Populated places established in 1921